Haiyuan County (Xiao'erjing: خَيْ‌يُوًا ثِيًا) is a county under the administration of the prefecture-level city of Zhongwei in the southwest of the Ningxia Hui Autonomous Region of the People's Republic of China. It is bordered by Gansu to the west. It was the site of the 1920 Haiyuan earthquake, which killed at least 200,000 people within and outside of Haiyuan.

Haiyuan County has many residents of the Hui ethnicity. They make up 70 percent of the total population. Although agricultural development is important in the county, the arid climate, high alkaline content of the soil, and the course planting kernels make it difficult to retain moisture and fertility. Due to these characteristics, farmers in the county have begun to develop organic fennel in recent years. Haiyuan is one of the poorest counties in Ningxia. The county government is located in the town of Haicheng, and the county's postal code is 751800.

Administrative divisions
Haiyuan County administers 5 towns and 12 townships.
5 towns
 Sanhe
 Qiying
 Xi′an
 Liwang
 Haicheng

12 townships
 Zhengqi
 Gaoya
 Guanqiao
 Shutai
 Shidian
 Jiaxian
 Caowa
 Jiucai
 Lijun
 Hongyang
 Guanzhuang
 Gancheng

Climate

Transport 

 G70 Fuzhou–Yinchuan Expressway
 Provincial Expressway S40

References

 
County-level divisions of Ningxia
Zhongwei